Matt Dowling is the representative for the 51st District of the Pennsylvania House of Representatives. He is a member of the Republican Party.

Early life
According to his official biography, Dowling graduated from Uniontown Area High School in 2003. He studied Theology and Philosophy at Franciscan University of Steubenville and obtained a B.A. in Business Administration and Management from Waynesburg University.

Political career
Dowling began his political career in 2016, when he defeated Tim Mahoney, a five-term Democratic incumbent, in the general election for the 51st District seat in the Pennsylvania House of Representatives.

The 51st Legislative District consisted of portions of Fayette and Somerset counties. In the state House, Dowling was assigned to the Judiciary, Liquor Control, State Government, and Urban Affairs committees.

2020 presidential election
In 2020, incumbent President Donald Trump lost Pennsylvania and was defeated in his bid for reelection. Trump and his allies refused to accept his defeat,  falsely claimed that the election was fraudulent or marred by irregularities, and carried out a months-long effort to overturn the election result. Dowling was one of many Republican members of the Pennsylvania Legislature who signed a January 4, 2021 letter to Pennsylvania's congressional delegation asking them to seek a halt to the 2021 United States Electoral College vote count (and thus the formalization of the victory of Joe Biden). The letter was sent on the eve of the January 6 United States Capitol attack, in which a pro-Trump mob stormed the Capitol in a bid to halt the counting of the votes and keep Trump in power.

Second Amendment Caucus Chairmanship
Matthew Dowling was named chairman of the House Second Amendment Caucus for the 2021-22 Legislative Session.

Upon Dowling's retirement Rep. Abby Major (R-Armstrong/Indiana/Butler) was named chair.

Drunk driving arrest and retirement
In June 2022, Dowling was charged with driving under the influence of alcohol, careless driving, driving an unregistered vehicle, and following too closely. The charges followed his arrest in South Union Township after he rear-ended another vehicle twice at a red light at a busy intersection. Dowling's blood alcohol content was .272, over three times the legal limit in Pennsylvania. The crash took place the day after Dowling's driver's license had been reinstated; his license had previously been medically suspended after an October 2021 automobile crash, which was due to a diabetic emergency. Dowling said he would enter treatment to "address any possible alcohol issues" and attributed the crash to "disappointing behavior that I have faced in the past with respect to alcohol."

On July 1, 2022, three weeks after the crash, Dowling ended his bid for reelection in 2022, removing his name from the ballot.

On September 19, 2022, the Editorial Board of the Pittsburgh Post-Gazette printed a favorable editorial about Dowling's proposed bill to allow self-exclusion from alcohol purchases. The editorial was titled: "Fayette County legislator Matt Dowling is making good things out of a bad decision." In the editorial the board says "The plan is not a panacea. Few people actually have their licenses scanned when buying a drink. But it’s an interesting idea that merits further study. And if something like it ever becomes law, and one person is saved from hurting himself or others, Matt Dowling will have turned his mistake into a triumph."

Commonalities Radio
The show which bills itself as discussing “Politics, Religion, and Finances – all the topics your grandmother told you not to discuss with friends” is hosted by retired State Representative Matthew Dowling.

“I am ecstatic about the new podcast. Commonalities provides a venue where we can discuss both sides of the big issues” Dowling said. “Using my network of political figures and community leaders from across the commonwealth I hope to provide local listeners with conversations with statewide newsmakers.”

Dowling’s first Episode featured Jeff Coleman, a retired legislator, political consultant, and recent Republican candidate for Lieutenant Governor along side Charles Pascal a progressive attorney and member of the Democrat State Committee. The trio will discuss what the ideal political system should look like, what is wrong with our current system, and how we fix what is broken.

Electoral history

2016

2018

References

1984 births
Living people
Republican Party members of the Pennsylvania House of Representatives
21st-century American politicians